Ibane Bowat (born 15 September 2002) is a Scottish professional football player who plays as a centre-back for Dutch club FC Den Bosch, on loan from Fulham.

Early life
Born in Kingston upon Thames, London Bowat was in the academy at Chelsea from under-6 level before leaving at under-12 level. He played less football at the start of his teenage years and played age group rugby union for Harlequins RFC before joining Fulham F.C. at under-16 level, having found he missed playing football.

Career
Bowat joined FC Den Bosch in January 2023 on loan with the option to buy. He made his senior debut on 20 January 2023 being named in the starting XI as FC Den Bosch hosted Jong PSV at the De Vliert in the Eerste Divisie.

International career
Bowat has represented Scotland at Under-19 level and in September 2022 was called up for the first time to the Scotland national under-21 football team Scotland under-21 squad. He made his Scotland under-21 debut on 7 November, 2022 against Iceland under-21 in Motherwell.

References

2002 births
Living people
People from Kingston upon Thames
Scottish footballers
Scotland youth international footballers
Scotland under-21 international footballers
Association football defenders
Fulham F.C. players
Chelsea F.C. players
FC Den Bosch players
Eerste Divisie players
Scottish expatriate footballers
Expatriate footballers in the Netherlands
Scottish expatriate sportspeople in the Netherlands